Verhne-Mutnovskaya power station is located in  to the southwest of the city of Petropavlovsk-Kamchatsky, Russia. The power plant was put into operation in 1999. The power plant has three identical direct cycle turbines of 4 MW each. Each turbine is rated at 8.3 bars inlet pressure and a steam flowrate of 8.4 kg/s. Another feature of the station is an air-cooled condenser. The power plant is part of a single complex with Mutnovskaya power plant-1. These plants share the same geothermal field. This complex is involved in the Central Power Hub.

References
(https://pangea.stanford.edu/ERE/db/WGC/papers/WGC/2015/26058.pdf

Geothermal power stations in Russia